The Station Theatre is a small independent dramatics theatre located in downtown Urbana, Illinois. It was converted into a theatre from a Big Four Railway passenger station in 1967. At that time, it was called The Depot. The building was  last used as a passenger station in 1956.

The theatre is now run by the Celebration Company, which was founded in 1972.

References

External links
 Official site
 University of Illinois archival material
 Historical Preservation Walking Tour

Buildings and structures in Urbana, Illinois
Theatres in Illinois
Tourist attractions in Champaign County, Illinois